ICER is a wavelet-based image compression file format used by the NASA Mars Rovers.

ICER may also refer to:

 Icer, a character in the Masters of the Universe franchise
 Institute for Clinical and Economic Review, a Boston-based nonprofit organization seeking to improve healthcare
 Incremental cost-effectiveness ratio
 International Computing Education Research, an annual research workshop sponsored by SIGCSE

See also
 Icer Air, stylized as ICER AIR, an urban big-air ski and snowboard event held in San Francisco from 2005 through 2008